Daniel Krejčí (born April 27, 1992) is a Czech professional ice hockey defenceman. He is currently playing with the HC Slavia Praha of the Czech Extraliga. Krejci was selected by the Traktor Chelyabinsk in the 5th round (117th overall) of the 2010 KHL Junior Draft.

Krejčí made his Czech Extraliga debut playing with HC Slavia Praha during the 2011–12 Czech Extraliga season.

References

External links

1992 births
Living people
Czech ice hockey defencemen
HC Oceláři Třinec players
HC Slavia Praha players
Ice hockey people from Prague
Czech expatriate ice hockey players in Slovakia
Czech expatriate sportspeople in Poland
Expatriate ice hockey players in Poland